Imaaduddin Shah (also credited as Imaad Shah; born 20 September 1986) is an Indian actor and musician. He is the son of actors Naseeruddin Shah and Ratna Pathak Shah.

Early life
Imaad was born to actors Naseeruddin Shah and Ratna Pathak on 20 September, 1986 in Mumbai. He has a brother Vivaan and a paternal half-sister Heeba. He did his schooling at The Doon School in Dehradun.

Career
Imaad made his acting debut in 2006 in his father's Yun Hota To Kya Hota. In 2007, he acted in Dil Dosti Etc under Prakash Jha, where he played a young Delhi University student with a penchant for the secret corners of the old town.

He is also a theatre actor and works with the theatre company Motley, founded by Naseeruddin Shah and Benjamin Gilani. He has been a part of many productions including Katha Collage, Waiting for Godot, By George and Manto Ismat Haazir Hain, apart from working with other groups.

He bounced back with his next film Sooni Taraporevala's award winning Little Zizou (2009) which traveled to film festivals all across Europe, North America and parts of Asia.

Subsequent releases, including 404, Tasher Desh and Mira Nair's The Reluctant Fundamentalist saw him playing dark and memorable characters.

He is part of the electro funk/nu disco duo Madboy/Mink with Saba Azad and is the frontman and guitarist/vocalist for the funk/disco band The Pulp Society.

Imaad Shah was recently seen in the web series 'A Married Woman', directed by Sahir Raza. The star cast also includes Ridhi Dogra, Monica Dogra.

Personal life
In 2006, he fell out of a moving local train in Mumbai and was hospitalized with serious injuries on his head and legs.

From 2013 to 2020, Imaad dated actress and musician Saba Azad. But they both remain friends after their breakup and made music together for their band Mad Boy Mink.

Filmography

Films

Television

Discography

Awards and nominations

References

External links

 

Male actors in Hindi cinema
21st-century Indian male actors
Indian male film actors
Living people
Male actors from Mumbai
Musicians from Mumbai
Indian male stage actors
The Doon School alumni
1986 births